Hawthorne is a census-designated place (CDP) in Mineral County, Nevada, United States. At the 2010 census, the population was 3,269, a decrease since the 2000 census, when it was 3,311. It is the county seat of Mineral County. The nearby Hawthorne Army Depot is the primary economic base of the town.

History

The first permanent settlement at Hawthorne was established in 1880. 

The townsite was selected in 1880 by H. M. Yerington, president of the Carson and Colorado Railroad Co. as a division and distribution site for the new railroad.

The location was adjacent to the important Knapp's Station and Ferry Landing on the busy Esmeralda Toll Road from Wadsworth to Candelaria. Connecting roads were built to all of the surrounding mining areas.

H. M. Yerington named the new town Hawthorne after a lumberman, rancher, and law enforcement friend he knew in Carson City. The first train arrived on April 14, 1881  loaded with prospective buyers for the new town lots. 

In 1883, Hawthorne took the Esmeralda County seat from declining Aurora but later lost it to booming Goldfield. In 1911, it again became a county seat, this time for the new Mineral County.

Hawthorne has been county seat of Mineral County since 1911.

Geography
Hawthorne is located at  (38.525198, -118.623053).

Climate

Demographics

At the 2010 census, the population was 3,269.

At the 2000 census there were 3,311 people, 1,465 households, and 937 families in the CDP. The population density was 2,234.9 people per square mile (863.8/km). There were 1,883 housing units at an average density of 1,271.0 per square mile (491.2/km).  The racial makeup of the CDP was 83.6% White, 5.0% African American, 3.2% Native American, 1.5% Asian, 0.2% Pacific Islander, 2.7% from other races, and 3.8% from two or more races. Hispanic or Latino of any race were 9.7%.

Of the 1,465 households 24.9% had children under the age of 18 living with them, 46.4% were married couples living together, 11.2% had a female householder with no husband present, and 36.0% were non-families. 31.2% of households were one person and 15.2% were one person aged 65 or older. The average household size was 2.25 and the average family size was 2.74.

The age distribution was 22.9% under the age of 18, 6.6% from 18 to 24, 22.3% from 25 to 44, 27.5% from 45 to 64, and 20.6% 65 or older. The median age was 44 years. For every 100 females, there were 97.8 males. For every 100 females age 18 and over, there were 96.2 males.

The median income for a household in the CDP was $34,413, and the median income for a family was $41,733. Males had a median income of $31,344 versus $25,058 for females. The per capita income for the CDP was $17,830. About 8.6% of families and 10.8% of the population were below the poverty line, including 14.7% of those under age 18 and 8.0% of those age 65 or over.

Education
Hawthorne has a public library, the Mineral County Library.

Place of interest
 Hawthorne Army Depot
 Hawthorne Ordnance Museum
 Mineral County Museum
 Walker Lake

Gallery

References

External links

 Hawthorne - Ghost Towns
 The Nevada Travel Network Description and History of Hawthorne by David W. Toll
 http://www.walkerlake.org/
 http://www.golfhawthorne.com/

 
1880 establishments in Nevada
Census-designated places in Mineral County, Nevada
Census-designated places in Nevada
County seats in Nevada
Populated places established in 1880

This article contains information in the public domain from the State of Nevada.